Prehistoric Isle 2 is a 1999 scrolling shooter arcade video game co-developed by Saurus and Yumekobo and published by SNK. It is the sequel to the original Prehistoric Isle, which was developed and released earlier in 1989 by SNK. In the game, players take control of helicopters to shoot at dinosaurs while rescuing people. Although first launched in arcades, the title has since been re-released through download services for various consoles. It received mixed reception since its initial arcade release and garnered less success than its predecessor.

Gameplay 

Prehistoric Isle 2 is a scrolling shoot 'em up game reminiscent of its predecessor where players take control of helicopters to fight against dinosaurs while rescuing people through various stages. The players control their helicopter over a constantly scrolling background and the scenery never stops moving until a boss that must be fought before progressing any further is reached.

Development and release 
A sequel to the original Prehistoric Isle was teased at the end of its credits sequence, but was not officially announced by SNK until a decade later. Masanori Kuwasashi, director of The King of Fighters '94 and The King of Fighters '95, submitted a proposal he worked with Samurai Shodown designer Yasushi Adachi for the sequel after the release of Quiz Meitantei Neo & Geo: Quiz Daisōsasen Part 2 (1992), but was initially rejected by SNK's management. Prehistoric Isle 2 was co-developed by Saurus and Yumekobo, with James H. Woan, Nobuyuki Tanaka and Shuji Takaoka at the helm as producers. Masaaki Yuki acted as main programmer, while a planner under the pseudonym of "Barso" served as designer alongside Tomonori Nagakubo and Y. Yonezawa, in addition of Masahiko Hataya acting as composer. Several staff members also collaborated with the project. The game was first released by SNK for the Neo Geo MVS board on September 27, 1999. The title has since received a re-release by Hamster Corporation in recent years on digital distribution platforms such as the Nintendo eShop, PlayStation Network and Xbox Live.

Reception 

Prehistoric Isle 2 garnered less success than its predecessor. Eric C. Mylonas of GameFan gave the arcade version an overall mixed outlook.

Notes

References

External links 
 Prehistoric Isle 2 at GameFAQs
 Prehistoric Isle 2 at Killer List of Videogames
 Prehistoric Isle 2 at MobyGames

1999 video games
ACA Neo Geo games
Aicom games
Arcade video games
Cooperative video games
Helicopter video games
Multiplayer and single-player video games
Neo Geo games
Nintendo Switch games
PlayStation Network games
PlayStation 4 games
Saurus games
Scrolling shooters
Shoot 'em ups
Side-scrolling video games
SNK games
Video game sequels
Windows games
Xbox One games
Video games developed in Japan
Hamster Corporation games